Elslack railway station once served the small village of Elslack in North Yorkshire, England. The station was built by the Leeds and Bradford Extension Railway in 1848. It merged in to the Midland Railway in 1851 though some services were operated by the Lancashire and Yorkshire Railway. The station was closed in 1952.

References

Disused railway stations in North Yorkshire
Former Midland Railway stations
Railway stations in Great Britain opened in 1848
Railway stations in Great Britain closed in 1952